Sara Uribe Cadavid (born November 28, 1990) is a Colombian model and TV host. She rose to fame in 2012, being one of the winners of the second season of Colombian reality TV show Protagonistas de Nuestra Tele on RCN.

Early life
Uribe was born in Andes, Antioquia. Her mother worked selling arepas while her father worked harvesting coffee. They lived in the municipality of Andes until Uribe was about 3 years old and then moved to Medellín as her parents fell apart. While in Medellín, she lived in her grandmother's house until problems emerged within the family.

As a child she faced many struggles, one of the most prominent being not having a secure income for her family so she started working from a very young age selling candies at school and getting part-time jobs such as selling clothes. At 14, she started modeling for various agencies doing advertising for several well-known trade-marks in Colombia.

Career
Finishing high school she was offered a college scholarship from her high school's principal, allowing her to pursue the studies she wanted. She decided to pursue a career in Business Administration, soon later leaving it to study Social Communication. As part of the final terms of her studies she worked for Teleantioquia as a TV host for shows such as Venga a mi pueblo Antioqueño in 2009 and for Cosmovisión in the show Modelos Televisión. She also participated in the beauty contest Miss Gaming Colombia in 2012, ending up winning the title.

In 2012, Uribe was cast as one of the contestants of the reality TV Show Protagonistas de Nuestra Tele on RCN being the winner. This show boosted her career, allowing her to work as a host for several TV shows mainly on RCN. Nonetheless, she has worked in different TV networks such as Canal 1 in the show Lo sé todo in 2017 and Caracol TV in La Kalle and La vuelta al mundo en 80 risas, the latter being in 2019.

Filmography

Television

Awards and nominations

References

Colombian female models
Colombian television personalities
Living people
People from Medellín
1990 births